Rutavand (also Romanized as Rūtavand and Rūtevand; also known as Rūtavān, Rūtehvand, and Rūtevān) is a village in Zalu Ab Rural District, in the Central District of Ravansar County, Kermanshah Province, Iran. At the 2006 census, its population was 84, in 19 families.

References 

Populated places in Ravansar County